WKLK-FM (96.5 FM, "K-96.5") is a radio station broadcasting a classic rock music format. Licensed to Cloquet, Minnesota, United States, the station serves the Duluth, area. The station is owned by Fond du Lac Band of Lake Superior Chippewa and has programming from Jones Radio Network.

History
The station was assigned the call letters KOUV on November 29, 1991. On February 18, 1992, the station changed its call sign to the current WKLK-FM. Previously, the station carried satellite-based oldies and hot adult contemporary formats.

References

External links

Radio stations in Minnesota
Classic rock radio stations in the United States
Radio stations established in 1991
Fond du Lac Band of Lake Superior Chippewa
Cloquet, Minnesota